Coral Springs Charter School was established in 1999 in Coral Springs, Florida, United States. The school was originally constructed in 1977 as an enclosed mall. When the mall failed, the nearly vacant structure was purchased by Charter Schools USA and converted into a combination school, serving students in grades 6 through 12. For the past nine years, Coral Springs Charter School has received an "A" grade under Florida's A+ Program, which measures student performance on the Florida Comprehensive Assessment Test. The high school portion also currently utilizes Block Scheduling while the middle school portion uses a double rotating schedule.

Grade point average / test score data 
The school's average weighted GPA for the 10th to 12th grade is 3.16.

PSAT 2008-2009 10th Grade

SAT 2008-2009 Means

ACT 2008-2009 Means

FCAT School Grades

Attendance, completion and SAT metrics 
(2004-2005 school year data from Florida School Indicators Report.)

See also 
 Charter school

References

External links 
 http://www.coralspringscharter.org/
 http://www.charterschoolsusa.com/

Buildings and structures in Coral Springs, Florida
High schools in Broward County, Florida
Educational institutions established in 1999
Public high schools in Florida
Charter schools in Florida
Public middle schools in Florida
1999 establishments in Florida